Roger IV may refer to:
 Roger IV, Duke of Apulia (1152–1161)
 Roger IV of Foix (died 1265), Count of Foix